Scott David Conn (born 1962) is an active duty United States Navy vice admiral and career naval aviator who served as the 30th commander of the United States Third Fleet from September 2019 to May 2021. He now serves as the Deputy Chief of Naval Operations for Warfighting Requirements and Capabilities since July 30, 2021.

Early life and education
Conn is a native of Lancaster, Pennsylvania, and a 1985 graduate of Millersville University of Pennsylvania. He was designated a naval aviator in May 1987. Conn is also a graduate of the Naval War College.

Naval career
Conn’s command tours include Carrier Strike Group 4; Naval Aviation Warfighting Development Center, Carrier Air Wing 11, the F/A-18 series Fleet Replacement Squadron (FRS) Strike Fighter Squadron (VFA) 106; and VFA-136.

Conn's sea tours involved seven deployments on five different aircraft carriers in support of Operations Deliberate Force, Southern Watch, Deny Flight, Enduring Freedom and Iraqi Freedom. He has flown in excess of 100 combat missions, has accumulated over 4,700 flight hours and 1,000 arrested landings.

Ashore, Conn had multiple flying tours involving flight in the A-4 Skyhawk, Northrop F-5, F-16 Fighting Falcon and FA-18 series aircraft. His staff tours include serving as the staff general secretary and United States Pacific Command (PACOM) event planner at the Joint Warfighting Center; as the executive assistant to Commander, United States Fleet Forces Command; and as the strike branch director for Director, Air Warfare (N98) and most recently completed a tour as the Director, Air Warfare (N98) on the staff of the Office of the Chief of Naval Operations.
He assumed duties as the 30th Commander United States Third Fleet in September 2019.

Conn was the recipient of the 2004 Vice Admiral James Bond Stockdale Inspirational Leadership award.

References

|-

|-

1960s births
Year of birth uncertain
Living people
United States Navy officers
United States Navy admirals
Millersville University of Pennsylvania alumni
Naval War College alumni
People from Lancaster, Pennsylvania
Military personnel from Pennsylvania